Munto is a Japanese original video animation (OVA) series containing two episodes that were released on March 18, 2003 and April 23, 2005. The episodes were directed by Yoshiji Kigami and were produced by Kyoto Animation. While the first episodes is entitled simply Munto, the second episode is titled Munto 2: Beyond the Walls of Time. The OVAs were licensed by Central Park Media in North America and are distributed by U.S. Manga Corps.

An animated television series remake and sequel to the OVAs entitled Sora o Miageru Shōjo no Hitomi ni Utsuru Sekai, again directed by Kigami and produced by Kyoto Animation, began airing in Japan on January 14, 2009 on Chiba TV. The episodes started airing at later dates on AT-X, KBS Kyoto, Mie TV, Sun TV, Tokyo MX, TV Kanagawa, TV Saitama, and TV Wakayama. Two pieces of theme music are used for the TV series: one opening theme and one ending theme. The TV series' opening theme, entitled , is performed by Eufonius and its ending theme, entitled , is performed by Ceui.

Munto

Sora o Miageru Shōjo no Hitomi ni Utsuru Sekai

References

External links
Munto official website 
Munto official website

Munto